Garden of Eden is an album by jazz drummer Paul Motian recorded in 2004 and released on the ECM label in 2005. It features Motian with a new band consisting of guitarists Ben Monder, Steve Cardenas and Jakob Bro, saxophonists Chris Cheek and Tony Malaby, and bass guitarist Jerome Harris.

Reception
The Allmusic review by Thom Jurek awarded the album 4 stars, stating, "Motian has been on a creative and compositional tear, and has been since the mid-'80s. This set is ambitious, full of humor, charm, warmth, and grace; it sings, whispers, talks, and at times it shouts; ultimately it offers listeners an intimate look at the complexity and beauty in the continually evolving soundworld of an artist who is a true musical giant".

Track listing
All compositions by Paul Motian except as indicated
 "Pithecanthropus Erectus" (Charles Mingus) - 7:06 
 "Goodbye Pork Pie Hat" (Mingus) - 4:56 
 "Etude" - 5:21 
 "Mesmer" - 4:39 
 "Mumbo Jumbo" - 3:34 
 "Desert Dream" (Chris Cheek) - 3:18 
 "Balata" (Steve Cardenas) - 3:39 
 "Bill" (Jerome Kern) - 3:04 
 "Endless" - 3:30 
 "Prelude 2 Narcissus" - 3:05 
 "Garden of Eden" - 4:09 
 "Manhattan Melodrama" - 4:43 
 "Evidence" (Thelonious Monk) - 3:31 
 "Cheryl" (Charlie Parker) - 2:00

Personnel
Paul Motian - drums
Chris Cheek - tenor saxophone, alto saxophone
Tony Malaby - tenor saxophone
Jakob Bro, Steve Cardenas, Ben Monder - guitar
Jerome Harris - bass

Note: Guitarists Steve Cardenas and Jakob Bro are heard on the left and right stereo channels, respectively, while guitarist Ben Monder and bassist Jerome Harris are mixed in the center. Saxophonists Tony Malaby and Chris Cheek are, respectively, center left and center right. Motian's drums are heard across the stereo spectrum, whether soloing or supporting the ensemble.

References 

2005 albums
Paul Motian albums
ECM Records albums